The Postbllok Memorial is a work of installation art by writer Fatos Lubonja and artist Ardian Isufi.

It is a memorial to the atrocities of the People's Socialist Republic of Albania and opened on March 26, 2013, on Dëshmorët e Kombit Boulevard in Tirana.

Location
The memorial is located near a statue of Ismail Qemali in the neighborhood where the nomenklatura built their dachas, and in fact is in what was once the garden of the dacha of Mehmet Shehu.

Description and symbolism
The Postbllok Memorial includes three pieces. One is a set of concrete girders taken from Spaç Prison, where Lubonja was imprisoned for a time. The girders are lined up in a row as they would have been in the halls of the Prison.

The second object is a bunker portion of the memorial, one of the main symbols of the dictatorship.

The third element is a piece of the Berlin Wall, meant to symbolize Albania's isolation, which was a gift from the state government of Berlin to the City of Tirana.

References

Monuments and memorials in Albania
Outdoor sculptures in Tirana